Nuray Hafiftaş (8 August 1964 – 14 February 2018) Azerbaijanis in Turkey Turkish origin in Karapapakhs nations was known for Idealistic ideology and national conservative Turkish women Turkish folk music artist, musician, composer, lyricist, songwriters, bağlama virtuoso of folk, Arabesque, İlahi, Turkish classical music and Azerbaijani folk music.

Early years 
Soon after her birth her family moved to Tophane, where Hafiftaş received her primary and secondary education at Tarlabaşı school. After that, she continued her higher education at the Istanbul University State Conservatory which is part of the Istanbul Technical University Turkish Music State Conservatory

Career 
After graduation Nuray Hafiftaş continued her professional life as performer at the Istanbul University State Conservatory for four years. At the same time she signed a four-year contract with TRT Istanbul Radio to perform as a singer. Nuray Hafiftaş has released more than 13 vocal albums of Turkish folk music.

Death 
Hafiftaş had been treated for large bowel cancer at Menzil, Kahta, Naqshbandi Sunni Islam group hospital of Kurtköy, Pendik, İstanbul. After treatment, she died in Istanbul on 14 February 2018 at the age of 53. On 15 February she was buried at Zincirlikuyu Cemetery after a funeral ceremony in Teşvikiye Mosque.

Discography 
Albums
 Asker Mektubu – Ceylan Music, 1987
 Yaradan Aşkına – Uzelli Casette, 1988
 Dön İki Gözüm – Sinan Music, 1989
 Dilanım – Zara Music, 1990
 Divane Gönlüm – Sindoma Music, 1990
 Azeri Türküler- Harika Plaque, 1991
 Turquie Aşık – Akbaş Müzik, 1991
 Atılmaz Sevda – Peker Music, 1991
 Arada Bir – Ulus Music, 1992
 Dinle – Kaya Music, 1993
 Şimdi Oldu – Şentürk Music, 1994
 Eline Düştüm – Soner Music, 1996
 Eyvah Gönül – Prestij Music, 1999
 Leyli Leyli – Prestij Music, 2002
 Sılayı Ver – Emrah Music, 2005
 Yıllarım – Clipper Music, 2007
 Yazı Bir Dert Kışı Bir Dert – Star Production, 2009
 İstanbul ve Sen – DNK & DMC, 2016
 Düet Arabesk 2018 (With Yunus Bülbül) – Taşkın Music Production, 2017
 Yarim – Poll Production, 2019

References

External links 
 
1964 births
2018 deaths
People from Çıldır
Turkish Sunni Muslims
Turkish folk musicians
Turkish people of Azerbaijani descent
Turkish folk poets
Ashiks
Tar players
Women drummers
Dutar players
Turkish tambur players
20th-century accordionists
21st-century accordionists
Tanbur players
Dombra players
Performers of Sufi music
Turkish drummers
Turkish accordionists
Bağlama players
Tonbak players
Rabab players
20th-century Azerbaijani women musicians
21st-century Azerbaijani women musicians 
Turkish lyricists
Women accordionists
Women oboists
Darülfünun alumni
Azerbaijani people of Turkish descent
Azerbaijani folk musicians
20th-century Turkish women musicians
21st-century Turkish women musicians
Turkish music arrangers
Classical accordionists
Turkish composers
Azerbaijani emigrants to Turkey
Turkish women songwriters
Santur players
Burials at Zincirlikuyu Cemetery
Azerbaijani-language singers
Deaths from cancer in Turkey
Deaths from colorectal cancer
Death in Istanbul